is a subway train station in Bunkyō, Tokyo, Japan, operated by the Tokyo subway operator Tokyo Metro. It is directly connected by an underground pedestrian passage to the Toei-operated Kasuga Station. It is integrated with the Tokyo Dome City complex and the Bunkyō ward capitol building.

Lines
Kōrakuen Station is served by the following lines:
 Tokyo Metro Marunouchi Line, station number M-22
 Tokyo Metro Namboku Line, station number N-11

Nearby , connected by a pedestrian passageway, is served by the following lines.
 Toei Mita Line, station number I-12
 Toei Ōedo Line, station number E-07

Layout
The Marunouchi Line platforms (1 to 2) consist of two side platforms serving two tracks on the second-floor ("2F") level, and the Namboku Line platforms (3 to 4) consist of an island platform serving two deep-level tracks on the sixth basement ("B6F") level.

Platforms

From March 2015, the Namboku Line platforms use the tune "Take Me Out to the Ball Game" as the departure melody, chosen as the nearby Tokyo Dome is used for baseball games.

Passengers
In fiscal 2019, this station had 106,481 passengers daily.

History
Kōrakuen Station opened on 20 January 1954 on the Marunouchi Line. The Namboku Line platforms opened on 26 March 1996.

The station facilities were inherited by Tokyo Metro after the privatization of the Teito Rapid Transit Authority (TRTA) in 2004.

From 13 March 2015, the tune "Take Me Out to the Ball Game" was used as the departure melody for the Namboku Line platforms.

Surrounding area

 Bunkyo Civic Center
 Tokyo Dome City entertainment complex
 Tokyo Dome baseball stadium
 Koishikawa Kōrakuen Garden
Several train stations nearby:
 Kasuga Station (Toei)
 Suidōbashi Station (JR East, Toei)

References

External links

 Korakuen Station information (Tokyo Metro) 

Railway stations in Tokyo
Tokyo Metro Marunouchi Line
Tokyo Metro Namboku Line
Railway stations in Japan opened in 1954